Gustavo Endres (born August 23, 1975 in Passo Fundo, Brazil) is a retired Brazilian volleyball player, a member of Brazil men's national volleyball team in 1997-2008, Olympic Champion Athens 2004, silver medalist of the Olympic Games from Beijing 2008, World Champion (2002, 2006), multimedalist of the World League, South American Championship, World Cup and the Grand Champions Cup. Endres added best blocker in World Championship 2002 and 2008 Olympic Games.

Personal life
He was born in Passo Fundo, Rio Grande do Sul, Brazil. His younger brother Murilo is also a volleyball player. He is married to Rachel and they have two sons: Enzo and Eric, who also playing volleyball.

Career

National team
He resigned from the national team after winning the silver medal of the Olympic Games Beijing 2008. Endres won Olympic gold medal in 2004 Athens. Endres the middle-blocker has also won the World Championships twice (2002 and 2006), the World League five times (2001, 2004, 2005, 2006 and 2007).

Awards

Individuals
 2001 FIVB World League "Best Blocker"
 2001 America Cup "Best Server"
 2002 FIVB World Championship "Best Blocker"
 2003 Pan American Games "Best Blocker"
 2006 CEV Champions League "Best Blocker"
 2006 Italian League "Best Blocker"
 2007 FIVB World League "Best Blocker"
 2008 Olympic Games "Best Blocker"

References

External links
 LegaVolley profile

1975 births
Living people
Brazilian men's volleyball players
Volleyball players at the 2000 Summer Olympics
Volleyball players at the 2004 Summer Olympics
Volleyball players at the 2008 Summer Olympics
Volleyball players at the 2003 Pan American Games
Volleyball players at the 2007 Pan American Games
Volleyball players at the 2011 Pan American Games
Olympic volleyball players of Brazil
Olympic gold medalists for Brazil
Olympic silver medalists for Brazil
Sportspeople from Rio Grande do Sul
Olympic medalists in volleyball
Medalists at the 2008 Summer Olympics
Medalists at the 2004 Summer Olympics
Pan American Games gold medalists for Brazil
Pan American Games bronze medalists for Brazil
Pan American Games medalists in volleyball
Medalists at the 2011 Pan American Games
Medalists at the 2003 Pan American Games
Medalists at the 2007 Pan American Games